The Montreal Company Location Historic District is located in Montreal, Wisconsin. It was added to the National Register of Historic Places in 1980.

History
Buildings for the Montreal Mining Company itself and houses for employees of the company were constructed from 1907 to 1927. Much of the area was designed by landscape architect Albert Davis Taylor.

Images

References

External links

 List of buildings, from Wisconsin Historical Society's Architecture and History Inventory

Industrial buildings and structures on the National Register of Historic Places in Wisconsin
Geography of Iron County, Wisconsin
Historic American Landscapes Survey in Wisconsin
Mining in Wisconsin
Iron mines in the United States
National Register of Historic Places in Iron County, Wisconsin
Company towns in Wisconsin